Ibrox railway station was a railway station in Ibrox, a district of Glasgow, Scotland. The station was originally part of the Glasgow and Paisley Joint Railway.

History
The station opened on 6 November 1843 and was known as Bellahouston. Bellahouston had a short life and was closed in 1845, however the station was reopened and renamed Ibrox on 1 March 1871. Ibrox station closed to passengers on 6 February 1967.

Reopening
In 2008, the Rangers Supporters' Trust issued a statement calling for the station to be reopened. The suggestion was met with disinterest from officials, public and media, as Ibrox Stadium is already well served by public transport in the form of bus routes and subway. The calls were made after it had been announced that public transport was to be improved in the East End of Glasgow, including the Celtic Park area, in time for the 2014 Commonwealth Games.

As of 2019, Glasgow Subway's Broomloan Depot's tracks have been extended from the former site of Govan railway station to the track bed of Ibrox, which is now home to a new depot.

References

Sources
Butt, R.V.J. (1995). The Directory of Railway Stations, Patrick Stephens Ltd, Sparkford. .

Disused railway stations in Glasgow
Former Glasgow and Paisley Joint Railway stations
Railway stations in Great Britain opened in 1871
Govan
Railway stations in Great Britain closed in 1967